Wang Chanchan (born 1983) is a Chinese team handball player. She has played on the Chinese national team, and participated at the 2011 World Women's Handball Championship in Brazil.

References

1983 births
Living people
Chinese female handball players
Handball players at the 2006 Asian Games
Asian Games competitors for China